Murray Craig is a Scottish former rugby union player. He played professionally for Glasgow Warriors and at amateur level for Currie normally playing at the Centre position.

Craig learnt his rugby at Haddington then played for Edinburgh Wanderers. He also played for amateur club Currie

He was capped for Scotland at Under 21 and Scotland 'A' level. He was also in the Scottish Thistles squad which toured New Zealand in 1997.

He represented the Exiles District side, winning the Scottish Inter-District Championship in 1994-95 season.

He was capped for the Exile side while playing his rugby for Waterloo. He left Waterloo in 1995.

Joining Leicester Tigers for a season till 1996.

He joined Nottingham Rugby in season 1996-97.

Craig joined Glasgow Warriors for the start of the 1998-99 season from Edinburgh Rugby. He played in Glasgow's pre-season match against Richmond, coming off the bench for his non-competitive debut. However he later failed a medical with Glasgow and was released.

In October 1998, Craig made the decision to move to Exeter Chiefs. Craig's two-year package - believed to be worth a total of £100,000, includes a house, car and a part-time PE teaching post at a local sports college.

In 2002, he was playing for Boroughmuir.

Craig became a rugby coach at Telford College in Edinburgh in 2005 He remained there till 2011. He is now a Teaching Fellow at Edinburgh University

References 

Scottish rugby union players
Living people
Glasgow Warriors players
Currie RFC players
Edinburgh Wanderers RFC players
Scotland 'A' international rugby union players
Scottish Exiles (rugby union) players
Year of birth missing (living people)
Rugby union centres